The defibrator is a thermo mechanical pulping refiner in which the pulp material, such as wood chips, is ground in an environment of steam between a rotating grinding disc (rotor) and a stationary disc (stator) each with radial grooves that provides the grinding surface. Wood chips are fed into the centre and are broken down as the centrifugal force pushes them towards the circumference of the discs where the grooves are finer to produce wood fibre. The size of the refined fibres can to some extent be controlled by altering the distance between the discs where a closer distance produces finer fibres but also requires higher grinding force. The capacity per machine is largely determined by the size of the machine, as well as the motor speed 1500 rpm or 1800 rpm.

History
In 1931 the Swedish engineer Arne Asplund filed a patent on a method to defibrate wood chips. As opposed to the Masonite-method, the defibrator-method (also known as the Asplund-method) uses pressurised steam to soften the wood chips, then grinding discs to pull the wood fibres apart. This grinding unit is what Asplund called the defibrator. It became the key product of his company, AB Defibrator. The Defibrator trademark is now held by Valmet, the successor of AB Defibrator, for its line of refiners for the panelboard industry.

References

Papermaking
Pulp and paper industry